Toni Korkeakunnas (born 15 May 1968) is a Finnish football manager and former player. He is an assistant coach with HJK.

Coaching career
On 23 November 2021, he signed a contract to join HJK as an assistant coach for the 2022 season.

References

External links

1968 births
Living people
Finnish footballers
Finnish football managers
Myllykosken Pallo −47 managers
FC Lahti managers
Association footballers not categorized by position
Footballers from Helsinki